Lady with Red Hair (1940) is an American historical drama film directed by Curtis Bernhardt and starring Miriam Hopkins, Claude Rains and Richard Ainley. Released by Warner Brothers it stars Hopkins as the nineteenth century actress Mrs. Leslie Carter. Future star Alexis Smith made her screen debut in a small role.

The film's sets were designed by the art director Max Parker.

Plot
When Caroline Carter is divorced by her wealthy husband, she also loses custody of her son Dudley in the proceedings. Down on the ground she decides to win her fortune and son back. She leaves Chicago for New York to become an actress and tries to get acquainted to the theatrical producer David Belasco.

Belasco just wants to get rid of Caroline and promises to write her a play to get her out of his office. He has no intention of giving her work, but when she ultimately confronts him on the matter several months afterwards, he tries to get her a part in a show.

He succeeds, but the show is a failure, and instead Caroline decides to marry an actor living at the same boardinghouse, Lou Payne. Belasco tries to stop her from domesticating too soon, and take a part in another show instead. This show is a success on Broadway and Caroline eventually gets an opportunity to return to Chicago to perform. However, her triumph is stained by the fact that she has grown apart from her son.

Caroline goes on to perform in both America and Europe and in lack of a family she is consumed by her career. After some time she decides to go back to Payne and marry him. Belasco gets jealous and punishes her by not letting her work with him anymore.

Caroline pursues a career on her own, but her ambitions are thwarted by a series of unsuccessful shows. Payne eventually convinces Belasco to start working with Caroline again, and the duo reconciles.

Cast
 Miriam Hopkins as Mrs. Leslie Carter
 Claude Rains as David Belasco
 Richard Ainley as Lou Payne
 Laura Hope Crews as Mrs. Dudley
 Helen Westley as Mrs. 'Ma' Frazier
 John Litel as Charles Bryant
 Mona Barrie as Mrs. Hilda Brooks
 Victor Jory as Mr. Clifton
 Cecil Kellaway as Mr. Chapman
 Fritz Leiber as Mr. Foster 
 Johnnie Russell as Dudley Carter 
 Selmer Jackson as Henry DeMille
Uncredited
 Alexis Smith as Girl at Wedding
 Cornel Wilde as Mr. Williams
 Maris Wrixon as Miss Annie Ellis
 Doris Lloyd as Teacher at Miss Humbert's School
 Lillian Kemble-Cooper as London Party Guest
 Halliwell Hobbes as Divorce Judge
 Creighton Hale as Reporter Eddie

References

Bibliography
 Daniel Bubbeo. The Women of Warner Brothers: The Lives and Careers of 15 Leading Ladies, with Filmographies for Each. McFarland, 2001.

External links
 
 
 
 

1940 films
American biographical drama films
Films directed by Curtis Bernhardt
Biographical films about actors
Films about theatre
Films set in the 1880s
Films set in the 1890s
Films set in the 1900s
Films set in the 1910s
Films scored by Heinz Roemheld
1940s biographical drama films
American black-and-white films
American historical drama films
1940s historical drama films
Films set in Chicago
Films set in New York City
Films set in London
1940 drama films
Warner Bros. films
1940s American films